Puri district is a coastal district of the Odisha state of India. It has one sub-division, 11 tahasils and 11 blocks and comprises 1722 revenue villages. Puri is the only municipality of the district. Konark, Pipili and Nimapara are the three NACs in this district. Satyabadi, Gop, Kakatpur and Brahmagiri are major semi-urban areas.

Name
The district is named after its capital city, Puri. In Sanskrit, the word "Puri" means town or city. The city is an important seat of Vaishnavism, and is home to the noted Jagannath Temple built by Anantavarman Chodaganga in the mid 12th century CE.

History

Pre-history
Like many other parts of Odisha, the Puri district contains Pleistocene river gravels and silts. So far, no prehistoric stone tools have been found in this region, although they are found in similar formations (river gravels, secondary laterite pits and murrams) in the nearby districts of Dhenkanal, Mayurbhanj,  Kendujhar and Sundergarh.

Early records
In the dramatic poem Anargharāghava, believed to date from approximately the 9th century CE, the town of Puri was called Purusottama. The name of the town is given as Purusottama Kshetra in the records of Anangabhima Deva III from the 13th century CE. The town was given this name, or Purusottama Chhatar or simply Chhatar, in the records of the Mughal Empire, the Maratha Empire, and the early British rulers. In the Yogini Tantra and the Kalika Purana the town is referred to as Purusottam, and the Puri region was known as Utkal.

Purusottama Kshetra became referred to as Purusottama Puri, then contracted into Kshetra or Chhatra, or simply Puri. In many early British records this town is known by the name Pooree.

History of the District as an administrative unit
Under Mughal Rule (1592–1751), Odisha was divided into three circars for the purpose of revenue administration, Jaleswar, Bhadrak and Kataka. Current-day Puri was part of Kataka circar. After the Marathas occupied Odisha in 1751, they divided Odisha into the Pipli, Kataka, Soro and Balasore chakalas. The chakala of Pipli included major portions of the modern district of Puri.

After the conquest of Odisha by the British in 1803, the province was divided into the Northern and Southern Divisions with the river Mahanadi forming the boundary. Robert Ker and Charles Groeme were appointed as judge, magistrate, and collector in Northern and Southern Divisions respectively. By 1805 both divisions were amalgamated; Groeme was replaced, and Ker became the judge and magistrate of the whole province. By 1818 the Office of the Commissioner was established and Robert Ker became the first commissioner.

In October 1828, the province was divided into three districts, Balasore, Cuttack and Jagannath, which was later renamed Puri. In 1912, the new province of Bihar and Orissa was formed, including these three districts. Orissa (now Odisha) became a separate province in 1936 and was merged with the states of Nayagarh, Daspalla, Khandapara and Ranapur in 1948. A separate sub-division comprising these ex-states was added to Puri district, with headquarters at Nayagarh. Bhubaneswar was merged with the district in 1959. At this point the district comprised four sub-divisions: Puri Sadar, Khurdha, Bhubaneswar and Nayagarh.

By 1995, the area previously known as the Puri district was divided into three new districts:

 Nayagarh district, comprising the old Nayagarh sub-division;
 Khordha district, comprising the old Khuradha and Bhubaneswar sub-divisions; and
 Puri district, comprising the old Puri Sadar sub-division.

Geography
The Puri district lies around the latitudes 19° and longitudes 84°29'E. It has a geographical area of 3051 km2 or 264988 Ha. It has varied geographical and geological divisions defined by rock types, soil, vegetation, water bodies and climate. The primary geological division is between the littoral tract and the level alluvial tract.

i) The littoral tract: This strip of the country lies between the level alluvial tract and the Bay of Bengal. Strong monsoon currents blow over the country for nearly 8 months of the year, producing sandy ridges parallel to the coast, varying from 6.5 km to a few hundred metres in width. These ridges stretch along the seashore for the full length of the sea coast, approximately150 km long. The littoral tract forms the dividing line between the Chilika Lake and the ocean.

ii) The level alluvial tract: The alluvial region is full of villages and rice fields, watered by a network of channels, through which the distributaries of the most southerly branch of the Mahanadi river find their way to the sea.

River system
The rivers of Puri district are generally tributaries of the Mahanadi river. They are largely dry or small streams in the hot season, while in the rains they receive more water than they can carry. Major rivers include:

1) Kushabhadra River: A branch of the Kuakhai River originates from Balianta and meets the Bay of Bengal at the shrine of Ramachandi, located 15 miles east of Puri. Its tributary Mugei joins with Kushabhadra.

2) Daya River: A branch of the Kuakhai river drains into the Chilika lake. Two small rivers, the Gangua and the Managuni, join with the Daya river below Kanas. The Daya river is believed to be the cause of silt build-up in Chilika Lake.

3) Bhargavi River: A branch of the Kuakhai river meets the Bay of Bengal after breaking up into numerous tributaries in the last two and a half miles of its course. Four main branches, the Kanchi, the East Kania, the Naya Nadi and the South Kanchi (which drains into Sar Lake) all derive from the left bank of the Kuakhai. The first three of these interconnect through several channels and finally join the Suna Munhi river, which in turn joins the Baliharchandi and ultimately drains to the Bay of Bengal via the mouth of Chilika. The South Kania dissipates in the marshes on the western shore of Chilika.

4) Kadua River: This is a monsoon fed river that drains into the Prachi River.

5) Prachi River: This river has its origin near Kantapara on Cuttack-Gop road and passes through the village of Kakatpur before draining into the Bay of Bengal.

6) Devi River: This is a branch of the Kathajodi River.

Beaches
Notable beaches include: Puri Beach; the Golden Beach; Beleswar Beach; Swargadwar Beach; Balighai Beach; and the Chandrabhaga Sea Astaranga beach.

Demographics

According to the 2011 census Puri district had a population of 1,698,730, roughly equal to the nation of Guinea-Bissau or the US state of Idaho. This gives it a ranking of the 291st most populous district in India (out of a total of 640).
Its population growth rate over the decade 2001-2011 was  13%. The ratio of females to males was 963:1000. The literacy rate was 85.37%. Scheduled Castes and Scheduled Tribes make up 19.14% and 0.36% of the population respectively.

At the time of the 2011 census, 95.09% of the population spoke Odia, 2.36% Urdu and 1.92% Telugu as their first language.

Culture and tradition
Puri's recorded history dates from the third century BCE, and the district has varied religions and cultures. Hindus are in the majority, with monuments to Shaivism, Vaishnavism, Shaktism, Ganapatya, and Mahavir. Other important communities include Muslims, Sikhs, Jains and Christians.

Temples
Important monuments include:

 Jagannath Temple, Puri
 Gundicha Temple, Puri
 Lokanatha Temple, Puri
 Jambeswar temple, Puri
 Sun Temple, Konark
 Barahi Temple, at Chourasi, in Nimapara Block
 Mangala Temple, Kakatpur
 Sakhigopal Temple, at Sakhigopal
 Amareswar Temple, at Amareswar, Nimapara Block
 Sculpture shed at Bishnupur, Nimapara
 Gramswar Temple, Terundia, Nimapara
 Alarnath Temple, Brahamgiri
 Baliharachandi Temple, Brahamagiri Block
 Kunteswar Temple, Araorh, Pipili Block
 Harihar Temple, near Pipili
 Shiva Temple, Jagadalpur at Delang Block
 Tara image at Badatara, Gop
 Bayalisbati Temple, near Gop
 Mohabir Temple, Siruli Sadar Block
 Sri Sri Bakreswar Temple at Balanga, Nimapara block
Baba Balunkeswar Temple at Arisandha, Nimapara Block
 Nilakantha Temple and Chirnnamasta Temple at Biranarasinghpur Sasana.

Traditional Fairs and Festivals

Religious festivals 
Makar mela at Chilika, January
Magha mela at Konark, January
Maha Shivaratri, February
Harirajpur Melan at Harirajpur, March
Amla Navami at Sakshigopal, March
Panchudola Balanga Melan at Balanga Melan field, Nimapara block, March 
Sahi Yatra for seven days from Rama Navami, March/April
Chandan Yatra, April
Siruli Mahavir Mela during Pana Sankranti, April
Jhamu Yatra at Kakatpur, May
Baliharachandi Mela at Brahmagiri during the Raja Festival, June 
Car Festival (Ratha Yatra), July
 Gosani Yatra, Dasahara, September/October
 Boita Bandan at Konark, October/November
 Dayana chori at Ghorodia in Pipili Block
 Anavasara at Alarnatha Mandira, Brahamagiri.
 Snana Purnima celebration of Jagannath and Naga Jatra for three days at Rupadeipur, Pipli.
 Sitala sasthi yatra at Biranarasinghpur sasana.
Tourist Festivals

 Konark Music & Dance Festival: Konark Natya Mandap, February
 Basant Utshav: Parampara Raghurajpur, February
 Sri Ksetra Mohotsav: Puri, April
 Gundicha Utsav: Puri, June
 Puri Beach Festival: Puri, November
 Konark festival: Konark, December

These festivals feature Odissi dance and folk dances from different parts of the country.

Dance and music
The role of dance and music in temple rituals in Puri was important enough to set aside a separate enclosure, the Nata mandira, as a focal point.  Nata mandiras are typically decorated with figures in various poses of dance and musicians playing a variety of instruments.

Odissi dance

Odissi dance is an ancient Indian classical dance form that originated in the Hindu temples of Odisha. Traditionally this dance form was taught to the devadasi (female temple dancers). In Odissi dances, the artists play out a mythical story, a spiritual message or devotional poem from the Hindu texts, such as Jayadev's Gita Govinda. After the abolition of the devadasi system, the traditional forms of the dance fell into disuse. Padmashri Guru Kelucharan Mahapatra was one of the gurus who revived the Odissi dance form in the mid-20th century.

Odissi music 

Orissi music is a genre of Indian classical music originating from Puri. It is believed to date back to the 2nd century BCE, when Kharavela, king of Odisha, acted as a patron for this form of music and dance.

Mahari dance
Mahari is a ritualistic dance form that was historically performed at the temple of Lord Jagannatha at Puri by devadasi dancers called maharis. After the abolition of the devadasi system, it is no longer danced at the Jagannatha Temple but continues as a cultural dance.

Folk dances
Gotipua dance is a folk dance of Puri, danced by boys under 14 years old, clad in female dress. The boys perform acrobatic figures inspired by the life of Radha and Krishna. The village of Raghurajpur is known for its Gotipua dance troupes.

Naga dances are danced by men wearing a heavy, elaborate costume including huge, highly decorated headgear and a false beard almost covering the face.

Medha dances are traditional dances in which the dancers wear a huge papier-mâché mask representing a demon or other character. Medha dancers participate in processions of temple idols on festival days such as Rama Navami.

Other folk dances
Other folk dances common in the district include Ghoda nacha, Dhuduki nacha, Jatra, Pala, Daskathia, Bhalu nacha, Mankada nacha and Navrang.

Other notable sites

Archeological Sites
Excavated archeological sites in Puri district include:

 Kuruma or Kurum - This site is 8 km from Konark and contains the remains of a Buddhist monastery from the 10th century CE.
 Manikapatana - This site is on the left bank of the Kushabhadra river, at the northern end of the Chilika Lake. It has been identified as the medieval port of Chelitalo described by the Chinese pilgrim Hiuen Tsang. 
 Khalkatapatna - on the Puri-Konark Marine Drive road is an ancient port that shows evidence of trade with Arabia and China in the 13th-15th centuries CE.

Theatres
Annapurna Theatre is a pioneer in the field of theatrical performances.

District museum Puri
The District Museum at Puri is one of the branch museums of Odisha State Museum and is managed by the state government. It was established in 1997.

Libraries
The District Library of Puri and Panchasakha Memorial hall Library, Sakshigopal are both managed by the state government's department of culture.

Puri district Culture Office
The Puri district Culture Office promotes cultural activities and implements government policy relating to art and culture. This office manages the District Library of Puri, Panchasakha Memorial Hall Library at Sakhigopal, and the District museum of Puri. It organises cultural programmes and offers grants to registered libraries, cultural institutions, and indigent artists. It also serves as the liaison to the Orissa Sahitya Academy and the Sangeet Natak Akademi.

Politics

The Odisha Legislative Assembly constituencies of Puri district and their elected members are listed below.

Notable people 
Gopabandhu Das
Nilakantha Das
Kelucharan Mohapatra
Manasi Pradhan
Raghunath Mohapatra
Sudarshan Patnaik

Villages 
 

Lunahar

References

External links

 

 
1828 establishments in India
Districts of Odisha